The 2009 Saarland state election was held on 30 August 2009 to elect the members of the Landtag of Saarland. It was held on the same day as state elections in Saxony and Thuringia. The incumbent Christian Democratic Union (CDU) government led by Minister-President Peter Müller lost its majority. The CDU subsequently formed a coalition with the Free Democratic Party (FDP) and The Greens, and Müller was re-elected as Minister-President. This was the first Jamaica coalition formed in Germany.

Parties
The table below lists parties represented in the previous Landtag of Saarland.

Opinion polling

Election result
Both the CDU and SPD suffered significant losses, losing almost 20% of vote share between them. This came primarily to the benefit of The Left, which achieved by far its best result in a western state, debuting at 21.3%. The Greens and Free Democratic Party (FDP) also benefited to a lesser degree. As in a number of western states during the 2007–2009 period, the entry of The Left meant that neither the CDU–FDP nor SPD–Green coalitions won a majority.

|-
| colspan=8| 
|-
! colspan="2" | Party
! Votes
! %
! +/-
! Seats 
! +/-
! Seats %
|-
| bgcolor=| 
| align=left | Christian Democratic Union (CDU)
| align=right| 184,537
| align=right| 34.5
| align=right| 13.0
| align=right| 19
| align=right| 8
| align=right| 37.3
|-
| bgcolor=| 
| align=left | Social Democratic Party (SPD)
| align=right| 131,241
| align=right| 24.5
| align=right| 6.3
| align=right| 13
| align=right| 5
| align=right| 25.5
|-
| bgcolor=| 
| align=left | The Left (Linke)
| align=right| 113,664
| align=right| 21.3
| align=right| 19.0
| align=right| 11
| align=right|  11
| align=right| 21.6
|-
| bgcolor=| 
| align=left | Free Democratic Party (FDP)
| align=right| 49,064
| align=right| 9.2
| align=right| 4.0
| align=right| 5
| align=right| 2
| align=right| 9.8
|-
| bgcolor=| 
| align=left | Alliance 90/The Greens (Grüne)
| align=right| 31,516
| align=right| 5.9
| align=right| 0.3
| align=right| 3
| align=right| 0
| align=right| 5.9
|-
! colspan=8|
|-
| bgcolor=| 
| align=left | Family Party of Germany (FAMILIE)
| align=right| 10,710
| align=right| 2.0
| align=right| 1.0
| align=right| 0
| align=right| ±0
| align=right| 0
|-
| bgcolor=| 
| align=left | National Democratic Party (NPD)
| align=right| 8,099
| align=right| 1.5
| align=right| 2.5
| align=right| 0
| align=right| ±0
| align=right| 0
|-
| bgcolor=|
| align=left | Others
| align=right| 5,962
| align=right| 1.1
| align=right| 
| align=right| 0
| align=right| ±0
| align=right| 0
|-
! align=right colspan=2| Total
! align=right| 534,793
! align=right| 100.0
! align=right| 
! align=right| 51
! align=right| ±0
! align=right| 
|-
! align=right colspan=2| Voter turnout
! align=right| 
! align=right| 67.6
! align=right| 12.1
! align=right| 
! align=right| 
! align=right| 
|}

Notes

References

Saarland
2009